Georg Lettau (born 1878 - died 1951) was a German lichenologist

Authority abbreviation

References

German lichenologists
1878 births
1951 deaths